Cyperus arenarius is a species of sedge that is native to parts of Asia and the Middle East.

See also 
 List of Cyperus species

References 

arenarius
Plants described in 1768
Flora of India
Flora of Saudi Arabia
Flora of Iran
Flora of Bangladesh
Flora of Oman
Flora of Kuwait
Flora of Pakistan
Flora of Sri Lanka
Flora of Vietnam
Taxa named by Anders Jahan Retzius